Natan Shalem (October 10, 1897 - 1959) was an Israeli geographer, geologist and researcher.

Biography 
Shalem was born in Thessaloniki to a traditional Jewish family. Growing up Shalem studied in various Jewish educational institutes.

In 1914 Shalem immigrated to Ottoman Palestine.

During the First World War Shalem began to teach in the moshava Sejera.

In 1919 Shalem went to study geology in Florence where he obtained his doctorate in 1924.

Teaching in Jerusalem 
After getting his doctorate Shalem returned to Palestine and settled in Jerusalem, where he worked as a teacher for geography, chemistry and physics at the Gymnasia Rehavia. Within this framework, Shalem took part in many local nature trips through the years together with his students. Shalem was among the founders of Land of Israel Wandering Association (אגודת משוטטים ארץ-ישראלית) together with his friend David Benvenisti. During the outings Shalem conducted various observations and measurements, and collected many samples of local rocks, fossils and plants. Shalem studied mostly the Judean Desert in particular.

Academic activity 
Shalem wrote many scientific papers following his observations which were collected in two books.

Every year in the summer Shalem traveled to Florence in order to keep being informed on the latest discoveries in the fields of geology and geography, and he took part in various scientific conferences. During the mid-thirties Shalem took part in a year of advanced training in geography at the University of London.

In 1953, after the Establishment of the State of Israel, Shalem became a member of staff at the Geological Institute of Israel where he engaged in seismology and established the Geophysical Institute of Israel (המכון הגיאופיזי של מדינת ישראל).

Commemoration 
The settlement of Mitzpe Shalem in the Judean Desert was named after him. (The name was suggested by Shalem's former student Rehavam Ze'evi). In addition, various and streets in several cities in Israel are named after him.

References

External links 
 Memorial site
 Natan Shalem's Geological-Paleontological collection Tel Aviv University

1897 births
1959 deaths
Jews from Thessaloniki
Sephardi Jews in Ottoman Palestine
Sephardi Jews in Mandatory Palestine
Israeli geographers
Israeli geologists
Israeli Jews
Israeli people of Greek-Jewish descent
20th-century geographers
20th-century geologists
Greek emigrants to the Ottoman Empire